Fume or fumes may refer to:

 Fumé (grape), another name for the French wine grape Sauvignon blanc
 Silica fume, a fine-grain, thin, and very high surface area silica
 Fifi La Fume, a purple skunks teen character from the animated television series Tiny Toon Adventures
 "Fumes", a song on the album None Shall Pass by Aesop Rock

See also
 Fuming (disambiguation)